Baree, Son of Kazan is a 1925 American silent drama film produced by the Vitagraph Company of America and distributed by Warner Bros., which acquired Vitagraph. It was based on a 1917 novel by James Oliver Curwood. The film starred Anita Stewart and is a remake of a 1918 version starring Nell Shipman.

Plot
As described in a film magazine review, evading the police, Jim Carvel tramps north, where he makes friends with Baree, a pup. He falls from a cliff and is rescued by Pierre and his daughter Nepeese. Bush McTaggart desires the young woman and, in a fight over her, Pierre is killed and Baree is shot. Nepeese is rescued and takes refuge with an Indian. Later Carvel returns and saves Baree from death in one of McTaggart's traps. He is led to Nepeese by the dog. When McTaggart makes one final effort to possess the young woman, Baree attacks the man and takes his life.

Cast
 Anita Stewart as Nepeese
 Donald Keith as Jim Carvel
 Jack Curtis as Bush McTaggart
 Joe Rickson as Pierre Eustach
 Wolf as Baree

Preservation
With no prints of Baree, Son of Kazan located in any film archives, it is a lost film.

References

External links

1925 films
Lost American films
American silent feature films
Vitagraph Studios films
Warner Bros. films
1925 adventure films
Films directed by David Smith (director)
American black-and-white films
Films based on American novels
Remakes of American films
Films about dogs
Northern (genre) films
1925 lost films
Lost adventure films
Films based on novels by James Oliver Curwood
1920s American films
Silent adventure films
1920s English-language films